The County of Belmore is a county in Queensland, Australia, located west of the Darling Downs in the Shire of Balonne.  

Like all counties in Queensland, it is a non-functional administrative unit, that is used mainly for the purpose of registering land titles. It was officially named and bounded by the Governor in Council on 7 March 1901 under the Land Act 1897.

Like all counties in Queensland, it is a non-functional administrative unit, that is used mainly for the purpose of registering land titles. From 30 November 2015, the government no longer referenced counties and parishes in land information systems however the Museum of Lands, Mapping and Surveying retains a record for historical purposes.

Parishes
Belmore is divided into parishes, listed as follows:

References

Belmore